The second cabinet of Dimitrie A. Sturdza was the government of Romania from 31 March 1897 to 30 March 1899.

Ministers
The ministers of the cabinet were as follows:

President of the Council of Ministers:
Dimitrie A. Sturdza (31 March 1897 - 30 March 1899)
Minister of the Interior: 
Mihail Pherekyde (31 March 1897 - 30 March 1899)
Minister of Foreign Affairs: 
Dimitrie A. Sturdza (31 March 1897 - 30 March 1899)
Minister of Finance:
George C. Cantacuzino-Râfoveanu (31 March 1897 - 1 October 1898)
Gheorghe Pallade (1 October 1898 - 30 March 1899)
Minister of Justice:
Alexandru Djuvara (31 March 1897 - 5 January 1898)
(interim) Anastase Stolojan (5 - 12 January 1898)
Gheorghe Pallade (12 January - 1 October 1898)
Constantin I. Stoicescu (1 October 1898 - 30 March 1899)
Minister of War:
Gen. Anton Berindei (31 March 1897 - 30 March 1899)
Minister of Religious Affairs and Public Instruction:
Spiru Haret (31 March 1897 - 30 March 1899)
Minister of Agriculture, Industry, Commerce, and Property:
Anastase Stolojan (31 March 1897 - 29 January 1899)
(interim) Dimitrie A. Sturdza (29 January -30 March 1899)
Minister of Public Works:
Ion I.C. Brătianu (31 March 1897 - 30 March 1899)

References

Cabinets of Romania
Cabinets established in 1897
Cabinets disestablished in 1899
1897 establishments in Romania
1899 disestablishments in Romania